The Case for the Crown is a 1934 British crime film directed by George A. Cooper and starring Miles Mander, Meriel Forbes and Whitmore Humphries. It was made at British and Dominions Elstree Studios as a quota quickie for release by Paramount Pictures.

Plot
A business partner is found dead and the company accounts have been tampered with; but is it murder or suicide?

Cast
 Miles Mander as James L. Barton  
 Meriel Forbes as Shirley Rainsford  
 Whitmore Humphries as Roy Matherson  
 Lawrence Anderson as Roxy 
 David Horne as James Rainsford  
 Gordon McLeod as Prosecution  
 John Turnbull as Prof. Lawrence

Critical reception
TV Guide called it "another dull British courtroom drama."

References

Bibliography
 Chibnall, Steve. Quota Quickies: The Birth of the British 'B' Film. British Film Institute, 2007.
 Low, Rachael. Filmmaking in 1930s Britain. George Allen & Unwin, 1985.
 Wood, Linda. British Films, 1927-1939. British Film Institute, 1986.

External links

1934 films
1934 crime films
British crime films
Films directed by George A. Cooper
Films set in England
Quota quickies
Paramount Pictures films
British and Dominions Studios films
Films shot at Imperial Studios, Elstree
British black-and-white films
1930s English-language films
1930s British films